Gopalganj Assembly constituency is an assembly constituency in Gopalganj district in the Indian state of Bihar.

Overview
As per Delimitation of Parliamentary and Assembly constituencies Order, 2008, No. 101 Gopalganj Assembly constituency is composed of the following:
Gopalganj  and Thawe community development blocks; Bairia Durg, Uchkagaon, Chhotka Sankhe, Harpur, Sakhekhas, Parsauni Khas, Nawada Parsauni, Luhsi, Jhirwa and Dahibhata gram panchayats of Uchkagaon CD Block.

Gopalganj Assembly constituency is part of No. 17 Gopalganj (Lok Sabha constituency) (SC).

Members of Legislative Assembly

^ bypoll

Election results

2022 
By polls necessitated by the death of MLA Subhash Singh.

2020

2015 
In 2015 Bihar Legislative Assembly election, Gopalganj was one of the 36 seats to have VVPAT enabled electronic voting machines.

References

External links
 

Assembly constituencies of Bihar
Politics of Gopalganj district, India